Valentin Ceaușescu (born 17 February 1948) is a Romanian physicist. He is the eldest and only surviving child of former communist President Nicolae Ceaușescu and his wife, Elena.

Biography

Early life and education 

Valentin Ceaușescu was born in Bucharest on 17 February 1948, less than two months after the establishment of the Romanian People's Republic. His father, future President Nicolae Ceaușescu, was an active member of the Romanian Workers' Party, earning himself various political and military positions; he was the country's Minister of Agriculture at the time Valentin was born. His mother was Elena Ceaușescu (née Petrescu). He had two siblings: Zoia, born in 1949, and Nicu, born in 1951.

Unlike many other members of his family, including his younger brother, Nicu, Valentin was not involved in politics. After graduating in 1965 from the Dr. Petru Groza High School, he enrolled in the Faculty of Physics of the University of Bucharest. In 1967, he decided to pursue further education by enrolling at Imperial College London in the United Kingdom. He played football as a goalkeeper on a college team during his time at Imperial College. After graduating in 1970 with a degree in physics, he returned to Romania.

Marriages and children 
On 3 July 1970, Valentin Ceaușescu married Iordana (Dana) Borilă (1946–2017), the daughter of communist party leader Petre Borilă. Both fathers, then political rivals, strongly opposed their children's marriage. The resulting fight, which lasted for years, eventually resulted in Dana and Valentin divorcing in 1989. After the Romanian Revolution, Dana and their child, Daniel, emigrated to Israel, and from there, to the United States; Daniel Ceaușescu, like his father, studied to be a physicist.

Valentin Ceaușescu married for a second time in 1995, and, with his new wife, Roxana Dună, he has a daughter, Alexandra, who studied architecture.

Arrest and later life 
In December 1989, during the Romanian Revolution, Valentin was arrested, along with the other members of his family. Known worldwide for their extravagant lifestyle, they were accused of undermining the economy of Romania. Valentin is said to have had a position managing the Steaua București football club. He reported that he had watched the trial of his parents on television while he was under arrest.

Valentin was freed from prison nine months later, after no charges were brought against him. During that time, his collection of 50 paintings by Romanian masters, engravings by Francisco Goya, and hundreds of rare books were confiscated. When he asked for restitution, the Romanian authorities argued that there are no documents which prove that he is the owner, and that the art collection belonged to the Romanian state, which promptly donated them to the National Museum of Art. In 2001, Ceaușescu sued the government for restitution. The courts found in favour of Valentin in 2009, and ordered the museum to return forty pictures. Most of the works were collected by him and his former wife; he planned to give most of them to Dana.

Scientific career 
After completing his graduate work in 1970, Valentin Ceaușescu became a faculty member at the Horia Hulubei National Institute of Physics and Nuclear Engineering. He retired in 2016. It was reported that he lives modestly on his pension of about RON 2,000 (about €450). He lives in a house owned by his current father-in-law, Constantin Dună.

Selected publications

References

External links 
 Interviu Valentin Ceaușescu despre Steaua, Dinamo și amănunte în premieră despre viața lui, Cristian Otopeanu, www.dolcesport.ro
 Bogdan Costescu, Valentin Ceaușescu încearcă să recupereze averea familiei, acuzând Parchetul General ("Valentin Ceaușescu tries to regain the family fortune accusing the General State's Attorney Office"), Gardianul, 28 October 2005

1948 births
Living people
Children of national leaders
Valentin Ceausescu
Scientists from Bucharest
University of Bucharest alumni
Alumni of Imperial College London
Romanian nuclear physicists